Hammerhead Networks was a computer networking company based in Billerica, Massachusetts.

It produced software solutions for the delivery of Internet Protocol service features.

History
It was founded in April 2000 by Eddie Sullivan, who also served as its CEO.

It was acquired by Cisco Systems on May 1, 2002, in a stock transaction worth up to US$173M. Cisco had previously owned a minority interest. It had 85 employees at the time of the acquisition.

References

Defunct software companies of the United States
Networking companies of the United States
Cisco Systems acquisitions
Software companies based in Massachusetts
Companies based in Billerica, Massachusetts
Software companies established in 2000
Software companies disestablished in 2002
Defunct companies based in Massachusetts